The governor of Koror is the head of government of Koror. The position was established in 1998 and succeeded the position of executive administrator.

List of officeholders

Executive Administrators

Governors

See also
 List of current state governors in Palau

References

Government of Palau
Palau politics-related lists
1998 establishments in Palau
Koror
Governors of Koror